Erzsébet Bognár (pronounced ; 1942 in Budapest – July 25, 2017) was a Hungarian handball player and World champion.

A loyal player of Ferencvárosi TC, Bognár spent fifteen years with the club (1960–75), during which period she won 4 Hungarian Championships and two Hungarian Cups. Additionally, Ferencvárosi reached the final of the European Champions Cup in 1971, however they fell short to record champions HC Spartak Kyiv.

Bognár also played 113 times for the Hungarian national team and participated at two World Championships. In 1965 she was a member of the team that won the event in West Germany, while six years later she collected the bronze medal in the Netherlands.

Achievements

Club
Nemzeti Bajnokság I:
Winner: 1966, 1968, 1969, 1971
Magyar Kupa:
Winner: 1967, 1970
European Champions Cup:
Finalist: 1971

International
World Championship:
Winner: 1965
Bronze Medalist: 1971

Individual
 Hungarian Handballer of the Year: 1966

References

 Kozák, Péter (1995). Ki kicsoda a magyar sportéletben?: (A–H). Szekszárd: Babits Kiadó. .

1942 births
2017 deaths
Handball players from Budapest
Hungarian female handball players
20th-century Hungarian women
21st-century Hungarian women